John Andreas Widtsoe (31 January 1872 – 29 November 1952) was a Norwegian-American scientist, author, and religious leader who was a member of the Quorum of the Twelve Apostles of the Church of Jesus Christ of Latter-day Saints (LDS Church) from 1921 until his death in 1952.

Early life
Widtsoe was born on the island of Frøya in Sør-Trøndelag, Norway. At birth his hand was attached to the side of his head, but he had an operation to correct this problem. When Widtsoe was two, his family moved to the Norwegian mainland city of Namsos. His father, also named John, died in February 1878. This left his mother, Anna, as a widow with two young sons to take care of: six-year-old John, and his younger brother Osborne Widtsoe. The family moved to Trondheim, where they were introduced to the LDS Church by a shoemaker.

In 1883, Widtsoe immigrated to the United States with his mother and brother. They arrived in Utah Territory in mid-November. Widtsoe was baptized a member of the LDS Church the following April.

Education
Widtsoe graduated from Brigham Young College in Logan, Utah. He attended Harvard University, graduating with honors in 1894.

In 1898, Widtsoe was ordained to the office of seventy and set apart to do missionary work in connection with his studies in Europe. He entered the University of Göttingen, Germany, and graduated with the degrees of AM and PhD in 1899. For part of his time in Europe, Widtsoe lived in Switzerland. The police wanted proof that he and his wife were married, and since they had neglected to bring their American wedding certificate with them, they were married a second time.

Academic career

In August 1900, Widtsoe became the director of the Agricultural Experiment Station at Utah State Agricultural College. While in this position, he founded The Deseret Farmer with Lewis A. Merrill and J. Edward Taylor. Their goal was to have it be a popular magazine that would be read and used by farmers.

In 1905, Widtsoe was dismissed from the agricultural college as a result of political debates about its future and feelings of William Jasper Kerr, the university's president, that Widtsoe was insufficiently supporting him.

For a short time, Widtsoe was a professor of agriculture at Brigham Young University (BYU), and is arguably the founding father of BYU's college of biology and agriculture. (Previously on the BYU campus, the John A. Widtsoe Building was the home of the College of Biology and Agriculture. A new building, the Life Sciences Building, took its place in 2014). Soon, however, he returned to Logan and succeeded Kerr as president of Utah State Agricultural College; he served in this position from 1907 to 1916. He also served as the president of the University of Utah from 1916 until his call as a member of the LDS Church's Quorum of the Twelve in 1921. Widtsoe was the fifth Commissioner of Church Education from 1921 to 1924 and was the seventh commissioner from 1934 to 1936.

During his time as an apostle, Widtsoe taught a religion class at the University of Southern California.

Federal government work
For two years in the 1920s, Widtsoe lived in Washington, D.C., where he supervised the reorganization of the Federal Bureau of Reclamation.

Service in the Quorum of the Twelve Apostles
Widtsoe was closely associated with the Improvement Era even before he became an apostle. He was associate editor of the magazine from 1935 until 1952.  As editor of the Improvement Era, Widtsoe "directed its growth from a magazine primarily for the youth to the voice of the whole Church". One of Widtsoe's employees while at the magazine was Hugh Nibley, who Widtsoe convinced to become a professor at BYU.

Widtsoe was also a member of the church's Genealogy Committee, where he pushed for creation and adoption of the Temple Index Bureau.

Missions to Europe
In 1923, Widtsoe accompanied fellow apostle, Reed Smoot, on a journey to Great Britain and the Scandinavian countries, during which they secured recognition and opened the way for missionaries of the church to return to these lands.

From 1926 until 1932, Widtsoe served as president of the European Mission. While in this office, he convinced the First Presidency to call a separate president of the British Mission, so that the president of the European Mission could focus on supervising the missions in continental Europe. While president of the European Mission, Widtsoe dedicated Czechoslovakia for the preaching of the gospel, and worked closely with Arthur Gaeth in starting the mission there.

Marriage and writings
Widtsoe married Leah Dunford, a daughter of Susa Young Gates, who was a daughter of LDS Church president Brigham Young. Their first child, Ann Gaarden Widtsoe, was born in Germany. The couple had eight children, but only three lived to adulthood. Widtsoe worked closely with his wife and mother-in-law on a biography of Young. Widtsoe also edited a book containing Young's significant teachings. Widtsoe was also the lead compiler of Gospel Doctrine, a collection of sermons and teachings of LDS Church president Joseph F. Smith.

Widtsoe and his wife authored The Word of Wisdom: A Modern Interpretation, a book which advocates the incorporation of healthy eating habits into the Word of Wisdom.

Widtsoe wrote A Rational Theology as Taught by the Church of Jesus Christ of Latter-day Saints, which has been cited by later LDS authors such as J. Reuben Clark. He also wrote Evidences and Reconciliations, which was a compilation of his Improvement Era writings, answering common questions on matters of faith. In this work, Widtsoe acknowledges that there are multiple interpretations that Latter-day Saints can hold on certain issues. One example is his explanation of the time involved in the creation of the earth: he indicated that faithful Latter-day Saints could hold the "six-day", "six-thousand-years", or the "undefined-period" interpretations of the creation. Although Widtsoe focused on explaining the rationale for the "undefined-period" interpretation, he did not belittle the other two or state that they were unorthodox.

In 1939, Widtsoe published Priesthood and Church Welfare and Priesthood and Church Government. His work, The Message of the Doctrine and Covenants, was edited by son-in-law G. Homer Durham, and published after Widtsoe's death. Widtsoe wrote Seven Claims of the Book of Mormon: A Collection of Evidences with Franklin S. Harris, Jr.

Widtsoe wrote a biography of Joseph Smith entitled Joseph Smith: Seeker After Truth Prophet of God. It was published in 1951, and reprinted by Bookcraft in 1957. Widtsoe also wrote Joseph Smith as Scientist: A Contribution to Mormon Philosophy, published by the Young Men's Mutual Improvement Association in 1908. In 1944, his essay, "The Divine Mission of Joseph Smith", was included in Handbook of the Restoration published by Zion's Printing and Publishing Company in Independence, Missouri.

Non-religious books by Widtsoe include Dry-Farming: A System of Agriculture for Countries Under a Low Rainfall (New York: MacMillan, 1920) and Dodge's Geography of Utah.

Widtsoe wrote two autobiographies. The first, In the Gospel Net, largely focused on his mother's conversion to the LDS Church. The second, In a Sunlit Land, told the story of his later life, and included explanations of his educational philosophy.

Hymns
Widtsoe wrote the texts to the hymns "Lead Me into Life Eternal" and "How Long, O Lord Most Holy and True," which appear as numbers 45 and 126 respectively in the 1985 LDS hymnal.

Death

Widtsoe died in Salt Lake City, of uremia; he also had prostate cancer for several years before his death. He was buried at Salt Lake City Cemetery.

Adam S. Bennion filled the vacancy in the Quorum of the Twelve following Widtsoe's death.

Published works

References

External links
 
 
 

1872 births
1952 deaths
20th-century Mormon missionaries
American Latter Day Saint hymnwriters
American expatriates in Germany
Apostles (LDS Church)
Brigham Young College alumni
Brigham Young University faculty
Burials at Salt Lake City Cemetery
Commissioners of Church Education (LDS Church)
Converts to Mormonism
Deaths from kidney failure
Genealogy and the Church of Jesus Christ of Latter-day Saints
Harvard University alumni
Latter Day Saint writers
Latter Day Saints from Massachusetts
Latter Day Saints from Utah
Mission presidents (LDS Church)
Mormon apologists
Mormon missionaries in Czechoslovakia
Mormon missionaries in Germany
Mormon missionaries in Switzerland
Norwegian Latter Day Saints
Norwegian Mormon missionaries
Norwegian emigrants to the United States
Norwegian general authorities (LDS Church)
Norwegian hymnwriters
People from Frøya, Trøndelag
People from Sør-Trøndelag
Presidents of Utah State University
Presidents of the University of Utah
Richards–Young family
University of Göttingen alumni
Utah State University faculty
Writers from Salt Lake City